Upper Pannonia may refer to:

 Pannonia Superior, Roman province that existed between the years 103 and 296
 Northern portion of the March of Pannonia, Frankish frontier march that existed between 804 and the 890s

See also 
 Lower Pannonia (disambiguation)